Rolf Olsson (1949–2007) was a Swedish Left Party politician, member of the Riksdag from 1998 to 2002 and again from 2003 to 2006. Olsson died suddenly on May 17, 2007 while hiking with friends.

References

1949 births
2007 deaths
Members of the Riksdag 1998–2002
Members of the Riksdag 2002–2006
Members of the Riksdag from the Left Party (Sweden)